Rapt is a 2009 French-Belgian dramatic film directed by Lucas Belvaux and starring Yvan Attal. It was nominated for 4 César Awards in 2010, including Best Film. It was released in France on 18 November 2009.

The film is inspired by the true story of the kidnapping of Édouard-Jean, 3rd Baron Empain, a very wealthy Hungarian-born Belgian aristocrat and CEO of the Schneider-Empain conglomerate, which occurred in Paris in January 1978.

Plot
Stanislas, a wealthy and high-profile businessman, is kidnapped and held for ransom. The kidnappers amputate one of his fingers and send it to his business with their demands for 50 million euros. His family comes into conflict with the police and his corporate associates as they struggle to raise the money. His business associates refuse to pay the ransom from corporate funds, but will loan the amount he will be able to repay, 20 million. Stanislas is kept in darkness, unwashed, with little food, repeatedly made to write desperate notes to his family.

Details of his mistresses and gambling losses emerge in the media. His wife, Francoise, and teenage daughters are traumatized. His business colleagues use it as an opportunity to turn against him. His mother rebukes his wife for not meeting his needs at home. The family refuses to cooperate with the police. When they try to deliver the ransom, police surveillance disrupts the exchange. After two months, the kidnappers arrange for another exchange. The family is now cooperating with the police, who again disrupt the exchange but take one of the criminals into custody. The kidnappers devise a new scheme. They release Stanislas after he agrees that he will secretly pay them off. They will enforce the agreement by killing a random person and tying the death to his failure to pay.

Stanislas is released to his distraught wife and two daughters who demand explanations for his affairs and gambling, publicity for which they have suffered during his captivity. Only his dog is happy to see him. His business associates explain his reputation prohibits his return and, when he refuses to resign, tell him he will be removed. The authorities suspect that he arranged his own kidnapping to pay off his gambling debts and force him to submit to questioning. Meeting with his attorney, he signs papers selling his shares in the business and postpones discussion of his divorce. His attorney advises him to relaunch his life, wealthy and unattached. In his mail, he receives the kidnappers' note that he must prepare to pay the agreed upon ransom.

Cast
Yvan Attal as Stanislas Graff
Anne Consigny as Françoise Graff
André Marcon as André Peyrac
Françoise Fabian as Marjorie
Alex Descas as Maître Walser
Michel Voïta as Le commissaire Paoli
Patrick Descamps as Massart
 as Le Marseillais
Pierre Rochefort as Fostier

Critical response
On Rotten Tomatoes, the film holds an approval rating of 97%, based on 31 reviews, with an average rating of 7.6/10. On Metacritic the film has a score of 71 out of 100, based on 16 critics, indicating "generally favorable reviews".

Accolades

References

External links
 
 Official website

2009 films
2009 drama films
2000s French-language films
Films directed by Lucas Belvaux
French drama films
Belgian drama films
French films based on actual events
Films about kidnapping
Films about businesspeople
French-language Belgian films
2000s French films